Sir Thomas Rouse, 1st Baronet (27 March 1608 – 26 May 1676) was an English politician who sat in the House of Commons variously between 1654 and 1660 and supported the Parliamentary cause during the English Civil War.

Biography
Rouse was the son of  Sir John Rouse of Rous Lench, Worcestershire who was MP in 1626. He matriculated at Brasenose College, Oxford on 20 October 1626 and was awarded BA from Corpus Christi College, Oxford on 31 January 1628. Also in 1628, he entered Middle Temple. He was created Baronet Rouse of Rouse Lench  on 23 July  1641.

Rouse was added to the Committee for Worcestershire in 1645 and was High Sheriff of Worcestershire in 1648. In 1654, he was elected Member of Parliament for Worcestershire  in the First Protectorate Parliament. He was an assessment commissioner in 1656 and was also Custos Rotulorum in 1656.

In 1660, Rouse was elected MP for Evesham in the Convention Parliament. He became a J.P. on 10 July 1660.

Rouse died at the age of 67 and was buried at Rouse Lench, where there is a monument.

Rouse married firstly Jane Ferrers daughter of Sir John Ferrers of Tamworth Castle, secondly Frances Murray daughter of David Murray and thirdly Ann.

References

 

1608 births
1676 deaths
High Sheriffs of Worcestershire
Alumni of Brasenose College, Oxford
Alumni of Corpus Christi College, Oxford
Members of the Middle Temple
People from Evesham
English MPs 1654–1655
English MPs 1660
Roundheads
Members of the Parliament of England for Worcestershire